Guillermo Torres may refer to:

 Guillermo Torres (basketball) (born 1937), Mexican Olympic basketball player
 Guillermo Torres (songwriter) (born 1966), American songwriter and record producer
 Guillermo Torres (wrestler) (born 1986), Mexican Olympic free-style wrestler
 Guillermo Alfredo Torres, Cuban sport shooter
 Guillermo José Torres (born 1943), retired Puerto Rican television reporter and news anchorman
 Guillermo Torres (footballer), Chilean footballer